The Manono-Kitolo mine is a former tin and coltan mine, which also contains one of the largest lithium reserves in the Democratic Republic of the Congo. The mine is located in southern Democratic Republic of the Congo in Tanganyika Province. The Manono-Kitolo mine has reserves amounting to 120 million tonnes of lithium ore grading 0.6% lithium thus resulting 0.72 million tonnes of lithium.

History

Original mine
The mine was run by Géomines from 1915 to the mid 1980s, producing 140,000 tons of cassiterite (tin) and 10,000 tons of columbite-tantalite (coltan). Since the mine's closure, companies have focused on the large lithium reserves at the site.

Lithium project
In 2018 studies reported a significant high-grade lithium deposit, estimated to have the potential of 1.5 billion tons of lithium spodumene hard rock situated in Manono in central DRC. AVZ Minerals, an Australian company, is developing the Manono lithium and tin project and claims to own (75%) of a joint venture with the Congolaise d'Exploitation Minière (25%) (Cominiere, a State-owned enterprise). The project is known to be the largest lithium spodumene hard rock deposit in the world, larger than the Greenbushes spodumene hard rock deposit in Western Australia.

In 2021, AVZ agreed to sell a 24% stake in the venture to the Chinese battery manufacturer CATL for $240 million. AVZ's acquisition of 15% of the project in August 2021 has been disputed by the company Zijin Mining in the International Court of Arbitration. Zijin points to a Congolese court order that blocked the deal's payments. In January 2023, the DRC mining ministry revoked AVZ's mining license, converting it back to a research permit. During the dispute, Zijin tried to have the northern portion of the license reassigned to them, and offered to let Cominiere keep a $34 million payment if AVZ could be excluded from the mine's ownership.

Manono tailings project
In addition to the new lithium project, as of 2022, the Canada-based Tantalex Resources Corporation was seeking to raise funds to reprocess tailings from the historical Manono mine.

References 

Lithium mines in the Democratic Republic of the Congo